The Under-Sheriff is a 1914 American short comedy film featuring Fatty Arbuckle.

Cast
 Roscoe 'Fatty' Arbuckle
 Chester Conklin
 Alice Davenport
 Minta Durfee
 George Nichols

See also
 List of American films of 1914
 Fatty Arbuckle filmography

External links

1914 films
American silent short films
1914 comedy films
1914 short films
American black-and-white films
Silent American comedy films
American comedy short films
Films directed by George Nichols
1910s American films